"Caught Out There" is a song recorded by American singer Kelis for her debut studio album Kaleidoscope (1999). Written and produced by The Neptunes, the song was released as the album's lead single in the United States on October 5, 1999. It peaked at number 54 on the US Billboard Hot 100 but fared better outside the United States, reaching the top ten in Canada, Iceland, Italy, the Netherlands, Sweden, and the United Kingdom. Pharrell Williams of The Neptunes said in an interview that the instrumental track was originally meant for rapper Busta Rhymes, who rejected it.

Critical reception
Quentin Harrison from Albumism stated that Kelis is "burning with righteous anger" on the song, noting that she is "all heart with a hint of hedonism". He added that "Caught Out There" was "[the] only one song [that] could announce Kelis with a bang", when her debut album was launched. AllMusic editor Jaime Sunao Ikeda picked it as a "standout" track of the Kaleidoscope album. Daryl Easlea for the BBC said in his 2012 review that "it still steals the show today, and was one of those songs that was heard everywhere at the time." Swedish newspaper Expressen stated that "over a crunchy beat, she makes up with a lying boyfriend". Brian Rusnica from The Heights described it as a "five minute explosion of emotion and female rage featuring the raw chorus, "I hate you so much right now!"". Ireland's Evening Herald stated that the song "established her as a leading light on the music scene", while the Irish Independent called it "shouty". 

Jim Wirth from NME commented, "Men, men, men; we're untrustworthy, lying scoundrels at heart, and as this Harlem-based hip-hop soulster rightly points out, we're always at our worst shortly after we've gone through the old 'I love you' routine. Kelis knows the score, though, because on Valentine's Day last year, some no-good, scum-sucking wretch did the dirty on her. Still, he did her a favour in the end, because 'Caught Out There', with its unforgettable primal-scream refrain, looks set to be massive very soon. Stretched out over a spartan backbeat, it would be a cynical swine who would dismiss this titanic slab of breakbeat pop as Jimmy Nail's 'Ain't No Doubt' but, y'know, for girls." Another editor stated that Kelis's "honeyed vocal, which broke into unfiltered madness, was the thing that took this track over the top." Sal Cinquemani from Slant wrote that it "proves why Kelis's legacy should extend beyond simply bringing the boys to the yard. No, she wasn't "the first girl to scream on a track", as she claims on 2006's "Bossy", but her debut single, released when she was a 19-year-old with pink eyebrows, not only became a girl-power anthem thanks to its livid hook and indignant lyrics, but helped announced the Neptunes as one of the premier superstar production teams of 21st-century pop music." A reviewer from Sunday Life deemed it as "attentiongrabbing".

Music video
The music video for "Caught Out There" was directed by Hype Williams. In the video, Kelis, in her technicolor spiral afro, blond, gold, orange, red, and fuchsia hair, starts in a confessional style, before opening to the chorus where she rips up the living room. Afterwards, Kelis and a group of fed-up women boycott and picket men. Finally, as she sings, "Got something for y'all", a gun cock is heard and the video finishes by alluding to her exacting revenge for her former lover's infidelity.

The video premiered on BET the week ending on October 10, 1999.

Impact and legacy
The song was used on MuchMusic's Shortest Weddings special. The signature yell "I hate you so much right now!" was used in the Daria episode "Partner's Complaint", first aired on February 25, 2000, and later in 2009 in British children's television sitcom Hotel Trubble. It was also used in BBC3's Most Annoying People 2007, under Tony Blair (8 on the list), and in 2011 in a Calvin Klein ad for CK One. In 2010, the line "look, I found her red coat" was sampled extensively in the James Blake song "CMYK". 

In 2003, Q magazine ranked "Caught Out There" at number 649 in their list of the "1001 Best Songs Ever".

In 2010, Pitchfork named it the 161st-best track of the 1990s. They wrote, "Soundtracking this post-breakup mania is a top-rate, ahead-of-its-time Neptunes production, with snapping keyboards accompanied by high-pitched tones that sound like dynamite exploding in space. In a word: Damn."

In 2012, NME placed the song at number 24 on its list of the "100 Best Songs of the 1990s".

In 2012, Porcys listed the song at number 24 in their ranking of "100 Singles 1990-1999", adding, "Here's the classic Kelis at its best. A perfect, uncommon bit of Neptunes in the foreground is the perfection of this protest- or rather statement-song."

In 2021, American rapper Ashnikko sampled the song on her single "Deal With It", which also features Kelis as a guest artist.

Track listings
UK CD single
"Caught Out There" (UK Radio Edit) – 3:36
"Caught Out There" (The Neptunes Extended Mix) – 6:23
"Suspended" – 4:53
"Caught Out There" (video)

US CD single
"Caught Out There" (Single Radio Edit) – 4:09
"Caught Out There" (The Neptunes Extended Mix) – 6:22
"Caught Out There" (LP Version) – 4:51
"Caught Out There" (The Neptunes Extended Instrumental Mix) – 6:22

US cassette single
A1. "Caught Out There" (LP Version) – 4:51
A2. "Caught Out There" (Single Radio Edit) – 4:09
B. "Caught Out There" (The Neptunes Extended Mix) – 6:22

Charts

Weekly charts

Year-end charts

Certifications

Release history

References

1999 debut singles
1999 songs
Kelis songs
Music videos directed by Hype Williams
Song recordings produced by the Neptunes
Songs about infidelity
Songs written by Chad Hugo
Songs written by Pharrell Williams
Virgin Records singles